Palace Yard may refer to:

 New Palace Yard
 Old Palace Yard

See also 
 Palace of Westminster